Defeat of the Mafia is an Italian noir-crime film  directed  by Warren Kiefer and starring Victor Spinetti and Maria Pia Conte. It was shot in the late 1968 but released only in November 1970. It was initially planned to be an Italian-Argentine co-production.

Plot

Cast

 Victor Spinetti as Charles Agostino 
 Maria Pia Conte as Jenny Ryan 
 Pier Paolo Capponi as Scott Luce 
 Alan Collins as Frankie Agostino
  Néstor Garay as  Jon Dahlia 
  Micaela Pignatelli as  Marjorie Mills 
 Carmen Scarpitta as Countess Torreguardia 
  Paolo Giusti as  Niki Velour 
  Margarita Puratich as  Susan Palmer 
 Luigi Bonos as Giulio 
 Enzo Fiermonte as  Count Torreguardia 
  Mariella Palmich as Nun 
  Franco Borelli as  Leone 
 Angela Goodwin as  Vice Consul 
 Aldo Berti as  Cacci

References

External links

Italian crime films
1970 crime films
1970 films
Mafia films
Films directed by Warren Kiefer
Films with screenplays by Warren Kiefer
1970s Italian-language films
1970s Italian films